A frizzle refers to a plumage pattern in domesticated chickens (Gallus gallus domesticus) characterized by feathers that curl outwards, rather than lying flat as in most chickens. The frizzle type is not a separate breed, but a variety within breeds. Though all breeds of chickens may be frizzled; it is most commonly seen in breeds such as the Cochin, Pekin, and Polish. Chickens with this pattern are sometimes referred to as frizzles.  The gene which causes the frizzles' peculiar feathering is an incomplete dominant trait.

Uses 
As a result of its unusual look, frizzles are primarily used as exhibition birds, and are included in most English language poultry standards.

There is a pure breed of chicken with this feature, known as the Frizzle breed.

See also
 Chicken breed of the same name

References

External links
PoultryHub Fancy Chicken Breeds - Frizzle

Chicken plumage patterns